Albert Parker Niblack (July 25, 1859 – August 20, 1929) was a United States admiral who served during the First World War. In 1940, the USS Niblack (DD-424), sponsored by his widow, was named in his honor.

Biography
Niblack was born in Vincennes, Indiana.  He was appointed to the United States Naval Academy September 22, 1876; graduated June 10, 1880; and was assigned to Lackawanna.

During the decades that followed, Niblack served on many ships and held several interesting posts ashore including work with the Smithsonian Institution, duty in the Bureau of Navigation, and a tour in the Office of Naval Intelligence. He was naval attaché to Argentina, Brazil, Chile, Germany, and the Netherlands, and served as a member of the General Board.

When the United States entered World War I, he took command of Division 1, U.S. Atlantic Fleet, with Alabama (BB-8) as flagship April 5, 1917, and was appointed Rear Admiral August 31. Niblack assumed command of Squadron 2, Patrol Force, October 23, and served in this post through the Armistice. He became Director of Naval Intelligence March 1, 1919, and Naval Attaché in London August 6, 1920. As Vice Admiral, he commanded U.S. Naval Forces in European waters January 15, 1921 to June 17, 1922. After commanding the 6th Naval District at Charleston, S.C., Vice Admiral Niblack retired July 25, 1923.

In 1927 Niblack was appointed head of the International Hydrographic Bureau in Monaco, a post he held until his death.

He was a member of the Military Order of the Carabao.

He died at Monte Carlo, in Monaco on August 20, 1929.

Publications
 Albert P. Niblack, Putting Cargoes Through: The U.S.Navy at Gibraltar During the First World War, 1917-1919,  Edited with an Introduction by John B. Hattendorf. (Gibraltar: Calpe Press, 2018).

References

External links

      history.navy.mil: USS Niblack

1859 births
1929 deaths
American expatriates in Monaco
United States Navy personnel of World War I
Directors of the Office of Naval Intelligence
Hydrographers
United States Naval Academy alumni
United States Navy admirals